Little Broughton is a village and former civil parish, now in the parish of Broughton, in the Allerdale district, in the county of Cumbria, England, located  west of Cockermouth. In 1891 the parish had a population of 820.

Governance
Little Broughton is part of the Workington constituency of the UK parliament. The current Member of Parliament is Mark Jenkinson, a member of the Conservative Party. Until the 2019 General Election the Labour Party had won the seat in every general election since 1979; the Conservative Party had previously only been elected once in Workington since the Second World War: this being in the 1976 Workington by-election.

For the European Parliament residents in Little Broughton voted to elect MEP's for the North West England constituency..

For Local Government purposes it is in the Broughton St Bridget's electoral ward of Allerdale Borough Council. This ward stretches north to Bridekirk with a total population at the 2011 Census of 4,178. Broughton is part of the Dearham and Broughton Ward of Cumbria County Council.

The village belongs to a Broughton Parish Council, which covers Great and Little Broughton.

Little Broughton was formerly a township in Bridekirk parish, from 1866 Little Broughton was a civil parish in its own right until it was abolished on 1 October 1898 to form Broughton and Broughton Moor.

See also

Listed buildings in Broughton, Cumbria

References

External links

Villages in Cumbria
Former civil parishes in Cumbria
Allerdale